Shelli Boone is an American actress, most known for portraying Evan Reed in Saints & Sinners. Her other work includes the films Holla, Crossover,  Tied Up, Out the Gate and Murder in Mexico: The Bruce Beresford-Redman Story, and the sitcom How I Met Your Mother. She also appeared in season 7, episode 14 of Grey's Anatomy.

Filmography
 As It Is (short)
 Grimcutty (2022 horror film)

External links
 

Living people
American television actresses
American film actresses
Year of birth missing (living people)
21st-century American women